Carrenleufú  is a village and municipality in Chubut Province in southern Argentina.

Etymology
Carrenleufú means "river of the green waters", or simply "greenriver".

Climate

Notes and references

Populated places in Chubut Province